Lukáš Nahodil (born 28 July 1988) is a Czech professional ice hockey player. He formerly played with HC Pardubice in the Czech Extraliga during the 2010–11 Czech Extraliga season.

He currently playing HC Olomouc during 2018-19 Czech Extraliga season.

References

External links

1988 births
Czech ice hockey forwards
Living people
BK Havlíčkův Brod players
BK Mladá Boleslav players
HC Chrudim players
HC Dukla Jihlava players
HC Dynamo Pardubice players
HC Kometa Brno players
HC Olomouc players
SK Horácká Slavia Třebíč players
Sportspeople from Třebíč